The Balsillie Prize for Public Policy is an annual Canadian literary award, presented to honour the year's best non-fiction work on public policy issues. Created in 2021, the award is presented by the Writers' Trust of Canada, and sponsored by technology investor Jim Balsillie.

Nominees and recipients

References

Canadian non-fiction literary awards
Writers' Trust of Canada awards
2021 establishments in Canada
Awards established in 2021